This list of Vogue Australia cover models 1990–present is a catalog of cover models who have appeared on the cover of Vogue Australia, the Australian edition of Vogue magazine.

Vogue Australia available since 1952 and was created to celebrate authentic Australian fashion and lifestyle. Early magazines published in United Kingdom and has running title: Vogue supplement for Australia (until 1958).

1970s

1970

1978

1979

1980s

1980

1981

1982

1983

1984

1985

1986

1987

1988

1989

1990s

1990

1991

1992

1993

1994

1995

1996

1997

1998

1999

2000s

2000

2001

2002

2003

2004

2005

2006

2007

2008

2009

2010s

2010

2011

2012

2013

2014

2015

2016

2017

2018

2019

2020s

2020

2021

2022

See also
 Elaine George, first Aboriginal model to appear on cover of Vogue Australia, September 1993.

References

External links
Vogue Australia
Vogue Australia at Models.com

Australia
Vogue
Australian fashion